Marotiri is a group of four uninhabited volcanic rocks protruding from the sea (and several submerged rocks), forming the southeastern end of the Austral Islands of French Polynesia. Marotiri is also known as Bass Rocks (Îlots de Bass in French), maybe according to the name of the European explorer George Bass. The closest island is Rapa Iti, 75 km farther northwest, but separated from it by an ocean depth of more than 1,500 meters. The rocks are part of the municipality of Rapa.

The climate is wet temperate. The lower rocks are almost devoid of vegetation - although there is some vegetation on the upper slopes and summits. They are important as a seabird rookery. Fish abound in the adjacent waters. The rocks emerge from a submarine platform 100 meters deep and 5 km in diameter. They lie at a distance between 1.5 and 3 km from one another. The total land area is 43,100 m2, which is broken down as follows by the individual rocks:

The southern rock is the largest, with a height of 113 meters at its highest point.

See also

 Desert island
 List of islands

References

Islands of the Austral Islands
Volcanic plugs of Oceania
Uninhabited islands of French Polynesia